The southern bristle tyrant (Pogonotriccus eximius) is a species of passerine bird in the family Tyrannidae. It is found in Brazil, Paraguay and northeastern Argentina. This species is sometimes placed in the genus Phylloscartes. Its natural habitats are subtropical or tropical moist lowland forest and subtropical or tropical moist montane forest. It is threatened by habitat loss.

References

Further reading

southern bristle tyrant
Birds of the Atlantic Forest
southern bristle tyrant
Taxonomy articles created by Polbot